The Perjury Act 1728 (2 Geo 2 c 25) was an Act of the Parliament of Great Britain.

So much of this Act as related to the stealing or taking by robbery any orders or other securities therein enumerated was repealed by section 1 of the 7 & 8 Geo 4 c 27. (The marginal note says that the effect of this was to repeal section 3 of this Act).

The Act, except so far as it related to perjury and subornation of perjury, was repealed by section 31 of the Forgery Act 1830. (The marginal note says the whole Act was repealed except section 2).

Section 5 was repealed by section 1 of, and the Schedule to, the Statute Law Revision Act 1871.

The Act was repealed as far as it applied to England on 1 January 1912.

The Act applied only to perjury in judicial proceedings. Section 2 provided that perjury and subornation of perjury were punishable with imprisonment for a term not exceeding seven years.

Section 6 provided for the Act to expire. The Act was revived and made perpetual by the 9 Geo 2 c 18.

References
The Statutes at Large, From the First Year of the Reign of King George the First to the Third Year of the Reign of King George the Second. Volume the Fifth. King's Printer. London. 1763. Pages 699 and 700.

External links
 The Perjury Act 1728 from Google Books

Great Britain Acts of Parliament 1728
Perjury